"No Goodbyes" is the fifth and last single by popular English rock band The Subways, from their debut album Young for Eternity. It was released on 12 December 2005.

Track listings
7" #1
 "No Goodbyes"
 "You've Got To Hide Your Love Away"
7" #2
 "No Goodbyes" - Chris Lord-Alge Remix
 "Mary" - Live From The Islington Academy
CDS
 "No Goodbyes"
 "Road To Nowhere"

Chart performance
The song peaked at number 27 in the UK singles chart.

References

2005 singles
The Subways songs
2005 songs